George W. Meeker (1833–1890) was the 23rd mayor of Columbus, Ohio and the 21st person to serve in that office.   He served Columbus for one term.  His successor was James G. Bull after 1870.  He died in 1890.

References

Bibliography

Further reading

External links
George W. Meeker at Political Graveyard

Mayors of Columbus, Ohio
1833 births
1890 deaths
Ohio Democrats
Otterbein University alumni
19th-century American politicians